Boris Yaroslavovich Kuznetsov (born 25 May 1957) is a former Russian professional footballer.

Kuznetsov began playing football with local side CSKA Moscow.  He also played as a central defender for Lokomotiv Moscow and Spartak Moscow in the Soviet Top League.

Honours 
Soviet Top League champion: 1987, 1989
Soviet Top League runner-up: 1985
Soviet Top League bronze: 1986
USSR Federation Cup winner: 1987

European club competitions 
With FC Spartak Moscow

UEFA Cup 1986–87: 6 games
UEFA Cup 1987–88: 4 games

References 

1957 births
Living people
Soviet footballers
Soviet expatriate footballers
Russian footballers
Association football defenders
Russian expatriate footballers
Soviet expatriate sportspeople in Czechoslovakia
Russian expatriate sportspeople in Czechoslovakia
Expatriate footballers in Czechoslovakia
Expatriate footballers in Bangladesh
Soviet Top League players
PFC CSKA Moscow players
FC Lokomotiv Moscow players
FC Spartak Moscow players
FC Rostov players
FC Rotor Volgograd players
MŠK Žilina players
Russian expatriate sportspeople in Bangladesh